"Stay Young" is a song by Australian rock band INXS. It was released as the first single from the band's second album Underneath the Colours, in September 1981. "Stay Young" peaked at number 21 on the Australian Singles Charts in November.

The song included Dave Mason and Karen Ansel from the Australian band The Reels on backing vocals.  

The video was directed by Peter Clifton who directed the 1976 Led Zeppelin concert film, The Song Remains the Same.  The video was filmed on Clontarf Beach, Balgowlah, Sydney, Australia. The production company was ECV (Enterprise Colour Video) in Crow's Nest, Sydney Australia. Cameraman: Jim Walpole, Editor: David Gillies, Offline Editor: Grant Shanks.

Track listing
7" single Track listing

Charts

References

External links
 "Stay Young" at Allmusic
 "Stay Young" at Discogs

INXS songs
1981 singles
Songs written by Andrew Farriss
Songs written by Michael Hutchence
1981 songs